Breira may refer to:

 Breira, Algeria
 Breira (organization), a 1970s Jewish organization
 Breira (Talmudic doctrine), a Talmudic doctrine